Padiyathalawa Divisional Secretariat is a Divisional Secretariat  of Ampara District, of Eastern Province, Sri Lanka.

Located in the DS division of Padiyathalawa is the town of Padiyathalawa.

The DS division of Padiyathalawa is further divided into 20 GN divisions:

 Dorakumbura
 Galode
 Hagamwela
 Holike
 Kehelulla
 Kirawana
 Kolamanthalawa
 Komana
 Marangala
 Miriswatta
 Moradeniya
 Padiyathalawa
 Palathuruwella
 Pallegama
 Pulungasmulla
 Saranagama
 Serankada
 Thalapitaoya Left
 Thalapitaoya South
 Unapana

References

External links 
 Divisional Secretariats Portal

Divisional Secretariats of Ampara District